Constantin Romaniuc (born 10 April 1953) is a Romanian bobsledder. He competed in the four man event at the 1976 Winter Olympics.

References

External links
 

1953 births
Living people
Romanian male bobsledders
Olympic bobsledders of Romania
Bobsledders at the 1976 Winter Olympics
Place of birth missing (living people)